The 2004 WNBA season was the 8th for the Sacramento Monarchs. The Monarchs went to the playoffs, where they upset the Los Angeles Sparks in three games, but fell in the conference finals to eventual champion Seattle Storm.

Offseason

Dispersal Draft
Based on the Monarchs' 2003 record, they would pick 10th in the Cleveland Rockers dispersal draft. The Monarchs picked Jennifer Butler.

WNBA Draft

Regular season

Season standings

Season schedule

Playoffs

Player stats

References

External links
Monarchs on Basketball Reference

Sacramento Monarchs seasons
Sacramento
Sacramento Monarchs